Oregon College of Oriental Medicine (OCOM) is a private college in Portland, Oregon focused on graduate degrees in acupuncture and Oriental medicine. OCOM's programs are accredited by the Accreditation Commission for Acupuncture and Oriental Medicine and authorized by the Oregon Student Assistance Commission's Office of Degree Authorization to award Master of Acupuncture and Oriental Medicine and Doctor of Acupuncture and Oriental Medicine degrees.

History
Oregon College of Oriental Medicine was founded in Portland, Oregon in 1983, and is one of the oldest Chinese medicine colleges in the United States. OCOM trains master's and doctoral students, conducts research and treats patients at its Old Town Chinatown campus (OCOM Clinic) and northeast Portland Hollywood Clinic. In July 2005, OCOM became the first college to graduate a cohort of Doctors of Acupuncture and Oriental Medicine. The college announced plans in July 2009, to move from Portland's eastside to a historic building in downtown's Old Town Chinatown district. The new LEED Gold certified facility was renovated at a cost of $15.2 million.  In September 2012, the school moved into its new home in Portland's historic Old Town Chinatown neighborhood.

Clinics

OCOM operates two Portland clinics and an herbal medicinary. The OCOM Hollywood Clinic, with eight clinic rooms, serves residents of northeast Portland, including the neighborhoods of Hollywood, Grant Park, Irvington and Beaumont-Wilshire. OCOM Clinic, at the college's Old Town Chinatown campus, opened in September 2012 and serves downtown residents and workers. The OCOM Herbal Medicinary is located on the ground floor of the college's campus. More than 20,000 low-cost acupuncture, Chinese herbal medicine, tuina, and shiatsu patient treatments are offered annually by the clinics, which also serve as teaching facilities for the college. OCOM has an active research department, and has received substantial research grants from the National Institutes of Health/NCCAM.
OCOM research projects have included a collaborative grant with the University of Arizona to study temporomandibular joint disorder.

References

External links
Official website

Acupuncture organizations
Chinese-American culture in Portland, Oregon
Universities and colleges in Portland, Oregon
Traditional Chinese medicine
Educational institutions established in 1983
Alternative medicine organizations
Universities and colleges accredited by the Northwest Commission on Colleges and Universities
Healthcare in Portland, Oregon
1983 establishments in Oregon
Private universities and colleges in Oregon